George Goodchild (1875 – 1927) was an English professional footballer who played as a winger for Sunderland.

References

1875 births
1927 deaths
People from the City of Sunderland
Footballers from Tyne and Wear
English footballers
Association football wingers
Sunderland A.F.C. players
Derby County F.C. players
Nottingham Forest F.C. players
Burton Swifts F.C. players
Jarrow F.C. players
Whitburn F.C. players
Ashington A.F.C. players
English Football League players